Ultimate TV may refer to: 

 UltimateTV (online service), a defunct online service
 Microsoft UltimateTV, Microsoft's DVR intended to compete with TiVo